Love of 7.7 Billion  is a South Korean show. It airs on JTBC on Monday at 23:00 (KST).

Format 
Love of 7.7 Billion is a program where young men and women representing 7.7 billion people around the world share their views on love and marriage.

Host 
 Shin Dong-yup
 Yoo In-na
 Kim Hee-chul

Participation Panel

1-day Panel

List of episodes 

References 

2020 South Korean television series debuts
2020 South Korean television series endings
Korean-language television shows